Crater Basalt volcanic field is a volcanic field in Argentina in the Chubut province.

It presents nine monogenetic volcanoes and several shield volcanoes that have merged to form volcanic plateaus. Major cones in the field are Cerro Contreras, Cerro Fermín, Cerro Negro, Cerro Ventana, Cerro Volcán and Pinchuleu. Of these Cerro Negro is the highest with  altitude.

The field's products include lava and tephra. In total 26 cones and 9 eruptive centres have generated  of eruption products. Volcanic cones are formed from spatter, which was still hot and liquid when falling down and fused together to form erosion-resistant spatter cones. Lava flows in the area are pahoehoe that formed lava tubes, lava tumuli and "whaleback" structures. Cerro Fermín alone is the origin of six lava flows.

This graben is part of a major fault system that extends from the Atlantic Ocean to the Pacific. Northeast of the field lies the Somuncura basaltic field of Oligocene-Miocene age and uncertain origin.

It was active between 600 and 340 ka. Three stages of activity have been identified, one 1 mya, the second 0.6 mya and the third 0.3 mya. Activity has migrated eastward during time. Other estimates indicate Holocene activity, supported by stratigraphic relationships of Cerro Ventana and Cerro Contreras lava flows with nearby river sediments. The Holocene Tagua ash (<2712–2360 BP) may originate from the Crater Basalt volcanic field but there are geographical and petrological problems with this theory. There may be present-day thermal anomalies at the volcano. In terms of hazard level, Crater Basalt volcanic field has been rated 35th out of 38 Argentinian volcanoes. 

The shield volcanoes have formed basalt as eruption products. Crater Basalt basalts include basanite and trachybasalts. Incompatible elements and rare-earth elements are enriched in these lavas. The volcanic rocks are derived from decompression melting of the asthenosphere, with garnet and lherzolite as precursors. Dunite xenoliths are found within the erupted basalts.

References 

Volcanoes of Chubut Province
Holocene volcanism
Volcanic fields